National nature reserves in Wales are selected and designated by Natural Resources Wales (NRW) (formerly the Countryside Council for Wales). There are 76 reserves all of which are also SSSIs, they cover , or less than 1.5% of the land area of Wales. A national nature reserve is designated because of its special biological, geological, habitat or landscape value and most in Wales are open to the public. They include upland and lowland areas, several offshore islands and in some cases estuarine and intertidal zones.

Management
Although the majority of sites are managed by NRW, a number are managed by other bodies, mainly in the public and wildlife charity sectors, including:

List of national nature reserves in Wales

See also
National nature reserves in England
Nature reserves in Northern Ireland
National nature reserve (Scotland)

References

External links
 Interactive map of designations in Wales - includes National Nature Reserves boundaries (select 'Nature Reserves' in UK Map Layers).
 Natural Resources Wales / National Nature Reserves
 Official map

 
National Nature Reserves in Wales